Vellonifer is a genus of moths belonging to the subfamily Tortricinae of the family Tortricidae. It contains only one species, Vellonifer doncasteri, which is found in the Indian state of Assam and in China.

See also
List of Tortricidae genera

References

External links
Tortricid.net

Tortricini
Monotypic moth genera
Taxa named by Józef Razowski
Tortricidae genera